Heather Mary Purnell (born November 5, 1986) is a Canadian gymnast who represented Canada at the 2004 Olympic Games. She trained at Ottawa Gymnastics Centre with coaches Tobie Goreman and Lori Iurello and Matthew Sparks. In 1999 she was the Canadian All-Around Artistic Gymnastics Champion.

References 
 
 

1986 births
Living people
Canadian female artistic gymnasts
Sportspeople from Ottawa
Stanford Cardinal women's gymnasts
Gymnasts at the 2003 Pan American Games
Gymnasts at the 2004 Summer Olympics
Commonwealth Games bronze medallists for Canada
Gymnasts at the 2002 Commonwealth Games
Commonwealth Games medallists in gymnastics
Pan American Games medalists in gymnastics
Pan American Games silver medalists for Canada
Olympic gymnasts of Canada
20th-century Canadian women
21st-century Canadian women
Medallists at the 2002 Commonwealth Games